The William and Susanna Geenen House is located in Kimberly, Wisconsin. Noted architect Henry Wildhagen was the designer. The house was added to the National Register of Historic Places in 1993 for its architectural significance.

It is an American foursquare house designed by German-born architect Henry Wildhagen.

References

Houses on the National Register of Historic Places in Wisconsin
National Register of Historic Places in Outagamie County, Wisconsin
Buildings and structures in Outagamie County, Wisconsin
Vernacular architecture in Wisconsin
American Foursquare architecture
Houses completed in 1921